is the third single by Japanese idol group STU48, released on January 29, 2020. Yumiko Takino served as lead performer for the title song. It topped the Japanese music charts in its release week.

Production and release 

It features the group's most intense dance routine at the time, choreographed by Tomohiko Tsujimoto, who had previously worked with the group on "Kaze wo Matsu". The song was performed live for the first time during the STU48 concert at the Tokyo Dome City Hall on January 18, 2020.

The single was released in four editions, seven including Limited Editions. B-side  is the first appearance in a single of the group's second generation trainees, who debuted in December 2019.  was the theme song for a commercial for Hiroshima Telecasting's Bridal Information Center and performed by members who appeared in the ad.  was created for the group's second original stage set list "Bokutachi no Koi no Yokan" and performed by all full members (excluding trainees).

Reception 
"Mubō na Yume wa Sameru Koto ga Nai" sold 333,000 copies in its release week according to Billboard Japan and placed first on both the Oricon Singles and Billboard Japan Hot 100 charts.

Notes

References

External links 
  

2020 singles
2020 songs
Songs with lyrics by Yasushi Akimoto
King Records (Japan) singles
Oricon Weekly number-one singles
Billboard Japan Hot 100 number-one singles